Restraint may refer to:

A form of control
 Restraint, or self-control, a personal virtue
 Medical restraint, form of general physical restraint used for medical purposes
 Physical restraint, the practice of rendering people helpless or keeping them in captivity by means such as handcuffs, ropes, straps, etc.

Arts, entertainment, and media
 Restraint (book), a non-fiction book on international relations by Barry Posen
 Restraint (2008 film), an Australian thriller directed by David Deenan
 Restraint (2017 film), an American horror directed by Adam Cushman

Legal terminology 
 Judicial restraint, a theory of judicial interpretation that encourages judges to limit the exercise of their own power
 Prior restraint, a government's actions that prevent materials from being distributed
 Restraint on alienation, in property law, a clause that seeks to prohibit the recipient of property from transferring his or her interest
 Restraint of trade, a restriction on a person's freedom to conduct business
 Vertical restraints, agreements between firms or individuals at different levels of the production and distribution process

See also 
 Constraint (disambiguation)